Vasantam is a 2003 Indian Telugu-language drama film produced by N.V. Prasad and Sanam Naga Ashok kumar on Sri Sai Deva Productions banner, directed by Vikraman. Starring Venkatesh, Arti Agarwal, Kalyani and music is composed by S. A. Rajkumar. The film won for two Nandi Awards.

The film opened simultaneously alongside the Tamil version of the film, Priyamaana Thozhi starring R. Madhavan, Jyothika, Sridevi Vijayakumar and Vineeth. The movie was remade in Kannada in 2010 as Hoo.

Plot
Ashok and Julie have been friends since childhood. They live in Hyderabad and share no love interest. Ashok marries Nandini, and although Julie's closeness to Ashok initially irritates Nandini, she subsequently accepts it. Julie falls in love with Michael D'Souza, a cricketer who's hoping for a place in the Indian cricket team and Ashok happens to be his main rival.

When Ashok is selected instead of Michael, Michael's father strikes a deal with Ashok that the marriage between his son and Julie will only take place if Ashok steps down and lets Michael substitute him and tells Ashok to cut his friendship with Julie so that he doesn't interfere in Michael's and Julie's life, to which Ashok agrees. Ashok acts as an unwilling person to his friend Julie. Julie decides to move out of Ashok's house and plans to stay at Michael's. Ashok plans to sell his property and give the money to Julie and to go to Mumbai with Nandini where his friend has offered him a job. Ashok and his wife vacate their house without informing Julie. Julie and Michael learn why Ashok is leaving Hyderabad and they rush to the railway station to stop them but fail. To spot Ashok easily, Julie sings a song "Gaali Chirugali" to which Ashok responds, and they reunite. Ashok ends up playing for the Indian team and over the time their children become friends too. The movie ends on a happy note.

Cast

Soundtrack

Music was composed by S. A. Rajkumar. Music was released on ADITYA Music Company.

Special appearance
V.V.S.Laxman, a former India cricketer played a guest role in this movie. In a scene, Laxman appears as himself, an already existing player for Indian national team giving advice and tips to the Andhra Ranji team player Ashok (Venkatesh) during practice sessions and who aspires to play for the India team.

Box-office performance
Even though the film was released just two days after the blockbuster Simhadri, it became a super hit.
 The film had a 50-day run in 139 centres and also completed 100 days in 71 centers.

Awards
 Nandi Special Jury Award – N.V.Prasad
 Nandi Award for Best Costume Designer – P.Rambabu

References

External links
 

2003 films
2000s Telugu-language films
Indian multilingual films
2003 multilingual films
Films shot in Greece
Films shot in Rajasthan
Films shot in Austria